, stylized as Book☆Walker, is a Japanese e-book store that sells manga, light novels, and magazines from various publishers, as well as a few published by themselves. It is based in Chiyoda, Tokyo and was created by Kadokawa Corporation. The company was founded in 2005 before launching their store in Japan in 2010 and internationally in 2014.

It has two subsidiaries, each with different focuses. One promotes the company's relationship with influencers and the other does reading-related software.

History
BookWalker was founded as Kadokawa Mobile Co., Ltd. on December 3, 2005 by the Kadokawa Corporation. On December 1, 2009, it was renamed to Kadokawa Content Gate Co., Ltd. In December 2010, the service was launched on iOS in Japan under the name Book☆Walker. An Android app and a PC website followed in April 2011 and December 2011 respectively. On July 1, 2010, the company was renamed to BookWalker Co., Ltd. In September 2013, the store was expanded to feature manga as well as light novels.

BookWalker Global was launched in English in November 2014, featuring manga from Viz Media and Dark Horse Comics. However, due to the lack of titles it was closed temporarily, before reopening in October 2015. In November 2015, the global store added thirty-five titles from Shōnen Gahōsha. In July 2015, the global store started offering titles from Yen Press. In December 2016, the Japanese store launched a magazine subscription service, called Magazine☆Walker.
In March 2019, the global store started offering titles from Kodansha USA. In April 2019, the global store started offering titles from Tokyopop. In May 2019, the global store started offering titles from Sol Press.

In December 2019, the Japanese store launched a subscription service that offers some of the books published by the parent company for a fee. On April 2, 2020, Magazine☆Walker ended service and was replaced with a new service called Book☆Walker Manga/Magazine Unlimited Reading.

Publishing
BookWalker has published a few titles internationally on their own for sale on their store, which include the following:

 The Combat Baker and His Automaton Waitress (light novel)
 Ga-Rei (manga)
 Magical Warfare (manga)
 Riddle Story of Devil (manga)
 The Ryuo's Work Is Never Done! (light novel)
 Tokyo Ravens (manga)

Subsidiaries

GeeXPlus
Established on July 1, 2019, this subsidiary is a talent agency with the goal of "connecting Japanese brands to global influencers by providing promotion planning, production, and distribution." As of June 1, 2022, the following talents are affiliated with GeeXPlus: The Anime Man, CDawgVA, Daidus, Emirichu, Foxen Anime, Gigguk, Ohara, Sydsnap, and TheGamingBeaver.

Trista
Established in September 2014, this subsidiary provides various services, such as Niconico manga and an app to help monitor time spent reading. It became a subsidiary of BookWalker on April 1, 2018.

See also
 J-Novel Club
 Kadokawa Future Publishing
 ASCII Media Works
 Enterbrain
 Fujimi Shobo
 Kadokawa Shoten
 Media Factory
 Yen Press

References

External links
 Official Japanese website
 BookWalker Global official website
 

Android (operating system) software
Anime and manga websites
Mass media companies based in Tokyo
Japanese companies established in 2005
Ebook sources
Internet properties established in 2005
IOS software
Kadokawa Corporation subsidiaries